GL, Gl, or gl  may refer to:

Businesses and brands
Air Greenland, IATA airline designator
Germanischer Lloyd, a classification society
GlobalLogic, a Digital Product Engineering Services company

Government and military
 GreenLeft, a Dutch political party
 Green-Libertarian, a North American political philosophy
 Gwardia Ludowa, a Polish resistance group during World War II
 Grenade launcher, a military weapon

Language
 Galician language (ISO 639 alpha-2 language code)
 Good Luck, in Internet slang
 Palatal lateral approximant, a digraph in Italian

Miscellaneous media
 Girls' love, an anime and manga jargon term for lesbian fiction
 Golden Lovers, a Japanese professional wrestling team
 Good Luck!!, a 2003 television drama
 Green Lantern, any of a number of similarly themed DC Comics characters
 Guiding Light, an American soap opera
 Gurren Lagann, a 2007 Japanese anime

People
G. L. Peiris, Sri Lankan politician and academic
Gary Lightbody, lead singer of Snow Patrol
George Lucas, American film director

Places
GL postcode area, UK
Geauga Lake, an amusement park in Ohio, US that closed in 2007
Gelnica District, Slovakia
Bergisch Gladbach, Germany (vehicle registration plate for Rheinisch-Bergischer Kreis)   
Canton of Glarus, Switzerland
Gloucester, a city in the South West of England
Gorkhaland, the name given to the area around Darjeeling and the Duars in north West Bengal in India
Governor Livingston High School, a high school in New Jersey
Greenland (ISO 3166-1 alpha-2 and FIPS PUB 10-4 territory code)

Science and technology
.gl, the country-code top-level domain (ccTLD) for Greenland
Degrees Gay-Lussac, a measure of alcohol by volume
General linear group, a concept in algebra
 General linear Lie algebra
Gigalitre (or gigaliter), a metric unit of volume
Glycemic load, an estimate of how much food will raise a person's blood glucose level
Graphics library, a program library designed to aid in rendering computer graphics to a monitor
Grenade launcher, in military parlance
Gulonolactone, an enzyme that produces vitamin C
 Gl, the symbol for Glucinium, the former designation of Beryllium
Gauss Law, an important law relating the Electric flux through a closed surface with the charge present inside it.
OpenGL

Vehicles
 Geely Emgrand GL, a Chinese compact sedan
 Mercedes-Benz GL-Class, a German full-size SUV

Other uses
 Gay-Lesbian, an alternative term for homosexual people
 General ledger, in accounting
 Gloss (annotation), a brief notation of the meaning of a word in a text
 Leather Union, a former German trade union